Pierre André Buffière (12 November 1922 – 2 October 2014) was a French basketball player and coach. He was born in Vion, Ardèche. He was awarded the Glory of Sport in 1995. He was inducted into the French Basketball Hall of Fame, in 2004.

Club playing career
During his club career, Buffière won 6 French League championships, in the years 1946, 1948, 1949, 1950, 1952, and 1955, and the French Cup, in 1953.

National team playing career
Buffière played at the 1948 Summer Olympic Games, and at the 1952 Summer Olympic Games. At the 1948 London Olympic Games, he was a part of the senior French national team that won the silver medal. Four years later, at the 1952 Helsinki Olympic Games, he was a member of the French team, which finished in eighth place.

Coaching career
Buffière had a long career as a basketball coach. As a head coach on the club level, he was a two time FIBA Korać Cup champion (1982, 1983), a six time French League champion (1950, 1952, 1955, 1975, 1977, 1983), and a three time  French Cup winner (1953, 1982, 1983). He was also the head coach of the senior French national basketball team, from 1957 to 1964.

References

External links
 profile
 [ André Buffière's career] 
 André Buffière's 90th birthday 

1922 births
2014 deaths
Sportspeople from Ardèche
French basketball coaches
French men's basketball players
Olympic basketball players of France
Basketball players at the 1948 Summer Olympics
Basketball players at the 1952 Summer Olympics
Olympic silver medalists for France
Olympic medalists in basketball
Limoges CSP coaches
ASVEL Basket coaches
ASVEL Basket players
Medalists at the 1948 Summer Olympics
Paris Racing Basket coaches
Le Mans Sarthe Basket coaches
Union athlétique de Marseille players
Shooting guards
ESSMG Lyon players
Stade Auto Lyon coaches
1954 FIBA World Championship players